Tej Hundal (born Tej Singh Hundal) is a singer-songwriter. He released his debut album, "Punjabiaan Da Raaj," on 9 August 2012. The album was composed & produced by Ravi Bal (UK). The album was released on MovieBox in the United Kingdom, Music Waves in Canada & Goyal Music in India

The forthcoming Single called "Deewana" will be releasing worldwide on (RBP Global) on 26/09/13. Music By: Ravi Bal.

Discography

References

Bhangra (music)
Living people
1976 births